The Express was a weekly newspaper published in the village of Tallula, Menard County, Illinois during the late 19th century. The paper contained local news as well as entertainment in the form of poems and short stories. It also included advice columns and advertisements for local stores and services. The paper was succeeded by The Tallula Journal in 1897.

History
The following names were used for newspapers in Tallula:
 Tallula Observer (Tallula, Ill.) 1876–1878, 
 The Express (Tallula, Ill.) 18??-1897, 
 The Tallula Journal (Tallula, Ill.) 1897-1???, 
 The Standard (Tallula, Ill.) 1929–1932, 
 The Tallula Standard (Tallula, Ill.) 1932-????,

References

Defunct newspapers published in Illinois
Menard County, Illinois